Vivestad church (Vivestad kirke) is located in Vivestad parish in Tønsberg municipality in Vestfold of Telemark, Norway. 

After the local parish church which had dated to 1628 burned down, the present church was built between 1913–14. The new church was built in wood and consecrated during 1914. The architectural design was by Carl Berner (1877-1943). The baptismal font, altarpiece and pulpit  date from the original church. 
The two church bells were cast at Olsen Nauen Bell Foundry in 1911–1913. In the 1970s, Vivestad church underwent major exterior repair.

References

External links
monument registration (Norwegian)

Tønsberg
Wooden churches in Norway